, sometimes romanized as Mampuku, is a Japanese television drama series and the 99th Asadora series, following Hanbun, Aoi. It premiered on 1 October 2018, and concluded on 30 March 2019. The series is based on the lives of Momofuku Andō, who invented instant ramen, and his wife Masako. Sakura Ando was selected to play the lead and is the first actress to play an Asadora heroine who is herself a mother.

Plot 
Fukuko Imai graduates from high school in 1938 and is about to begin work at a high-class hotel in Osaka. Her oldest sister Saki is about to get married, so Fukuko arranges for an inventor, Manpei Tachibana, to do a show at the ceremony using his new slide projectors. A few years later, when Japan is at war, they meet again and start dating, but Fukuko's mother Suzu wants her to marry the man she selects. Manpei tries to help by finding a good hospital when Saki is diagnosed with tuberculosis, but Saki's death only makes Suzu object to him even more. But things turned bad when Manpei is arrested by the Kenpeitai for supposedly illegally selling military goods. Manpei withstands the daily brutal interrogations as Fukuko's hard efforts eventually unearth the truth that Manpei's partner was the culprit. Fukuko nurses him back to health and Suzu finally consents to their marriage.

During the war the whole family moved to the countryside and lived with Manpei's relatives to avoid allied bombings. After the war the family made Hanko to make a living. Later Manpei's friend Mr. Sera helped the family locate an abandoned factory near the sea where they could live and find a new way to make a living. Manpei decided to use the steel plates in the factory to make salt, which was a highly sought after commodity at the time. After the birth of his son and having witnessed how Fukuko suffered from malnutrition after giving birth, Manpei decided to work on a nutritional product for the public called Daneehon. But some of the workers were using grenades they discovered hidden under the factory floor for Blast fishing, resulting in the arrest of Manpei and his workers by the Allied Army for suspicion of conspiracy against the Occupation of Japan. Fortunately Manpei and co was found to be innocent and released.

Deneehon proves to be popular. Manpei and Mr. Sera arranged for a group of young workers to move to Tokyo to establish a sales company. Manpei also provided scholarships for the young workers to attend university part time and complete their education in Tokyo. But the Allied Army considered the scholarships as tax evasion and arrested Manpei. Fukuko enlisted the help of lawyer Azuma Taiichi, who helped Manpei to sell of the sales rights of Daneehon to pay for the fines. Azuma also helped Manpei to dissolve his Tachibara nutrition food company, in order to evade the tax authorities. But the tax authorities went to Fukuko's home to confiscate her private assets. Fukuko also gave birth to the couple's daughter Sachi while Manpei was imprisoned. Azuma then asked Manpei to sue the tax authorities for treating scholarships as a form of tax evasion, which was not true. Azuma also turned to the media to put pressure on the tax authorities. In the end the tax authorities decided to release Manpei as a condition for Azuma to withhold the case.

Cast

Imai family 

 Sakura Andō as Fukuko Imai
 Keiko Matsuzaka as Suzu Imai, Fukuko's mother
 Yuki Uchida as Saki Imai, Fukuko's sister

Kōda family 

 Nao Matsushita as Katsuko Kōda, Fukuko's sister
 Jun Kaname as Tadahiko Kōda, Katsuko's husband
 Yukino Kishii as Taka Kōda, Katsuko's daughter
 Konomi Okuno as Yoshino Kōda, Katsuko's daughter
 Ryuto Ueda as Shigeyuki Kōda, Katsuko's son
 Yuki Takada as Manabu Kōda, Katsuko's son

Osaka Toyo Hotel employee 

 Manami Hashimoto as Megumi Hoshina, a hotel senior
 Kenjirō Fujiyama as Kōkichi Noro, Fukuko's colleague
 Narumi as Utae Kashida, a senior at the telephone exchange agency
 Kotarō Soganoya as Saburō Omaeda, a hotel manager

Others in Osaka 

 Hiroki Hasegawa as Manpei Tachibana, Fukuko's husband
 Ryohei Otani as Shinichi Onozuka, Saki's husband
 Isao Hashizume as Ryōzō Mitamura
 Kataoka Ainosuke VI as Keisuke Kajitani, Manpei's partner
 Kenta Kiritani as Katsuo Sera, a trading company's manager
 Rena Matsui as Toshiko Kano
 Kumi Kureshiro as Hana Ikegami
 Kenta Hamano as Zen'nosuke Maki, a dentist

Others 

 Kōji Seto as Shigeru Kanbe
 Akiyoshi Nakao as Kōsuke Oka
 Masaki Suda as Taichi Azuma, a young lawyer
Maynard Plant (Monkey Majik) as Harry Bingham, a soldier
Blaise Plant (Monkey Majik) as Jonathan May, a soldier
 Taiiku Okazaki as Charlie Tanaka, a Japanese soldier
 Masaya Kato as Akira Kawakami
 Riho Makise as Shinobu Kawakami
 Mai Fukagawa as Yoshino Kōda
 Eiji Okuda
 Tetsushi Tanaka

References

External links
 

2018 Japanese television series debuts
2019 Japanese television series endings
Asadora
Television shows set in Osaka